Sport in Germany is an important part of German culture and their society.
In 2006 about 28 million people were members of the more than 2 sport clubs in Germany. Almost all sports clubs are represented by the German Olympic Sports Federation.

History

Friedrich Ludwig Jahn known as Turnvater Jahn (father of gymnastics) was born in 1778 and worked as an assistant teacher in Berlin. At Berlin's Hasenheide Friedrich Ludwig Jahn opened the first German gymnastics field ('Turnplatz'), or open-air gymnasium, in spring 1811. His activities were particularly pointed at the youth, with whom he went to the gym field in free afternoons. The German gymnastics, understood by Jahn as a whole of the physical exercises.

Jahn developed well-known gymnastic equipment, invented also new apparatuses. Particularly by his main writing "Die Deutsche Turnkunst" (1816) the apparatus gymnastics developed to an independent kind of sport, and so the gym activities were not only limited to simple physical exercises, which he quoted as following: "Going, running, jumping, throwing, carrying are free exercises, everywhere applicable, as free as fresh air."

With the national gymnastics festivals in Coburg in 1860, in Berlin in 1861 and in Leipzig in 1863, the memory of Jahn's ideas returned into the people's consciousness. The inscription at the gable of his house "Frisch, Fromm, Fröhlich, Frei", translated as 'fresh, pious, cheerful, free", which originated in Jahn's time, became the basic idea of the German gymnastics movement.

In 1934, the Nazi government founded the Deutscher Reichsbund für Leibesübungen, later the Nationalsozialistischer Reichsbund für Leibesübungen, as the official sports governing body of the Third Reich. All other German sport associations gradually lost their freedom and were coopted into it. The organization was disbanded in 1945 by the American military government.

Olympics

In the all-time Olympic Games medal count through 2006 Germany ranks fifth, East Germany seventh and West Germany twenty-first. If all the medals are combined Germany ranks third.
If only winter olympic medals count, from all German states (East, West, united team and united Germany), it is the nation with the most medals.

Germany has hosted the Summer Olympic Games twice, in Berlin in 1936 and in Munich in 1972.  Germany hosted the Winter Olympic Games in 1936 when they were staged in the Bavarian twin towns of Garmisch and Partenkirchen.

Germany claimed the most, if not, gold medals and the most total medals during the 1992, 1998, 2002 and 2006 Winter Olympics in Turin. East Germany claimed the most gold medals at 1984 Winter Olympics.

Association football

Football (soccer) is the most popular sport in Germany. With a total of 26,000 clubs and 178,000 teams the German football sport is financed by means of state funding and state contributions, voluntary service, private sponsors and membership fees.

Germany's top level football league, known as the Bundesliga, has the highest average attendances of any association football league in the world; among all professional sports leagues, its average attendance is second only to American football's NFL. As of the 2019–20 season, the Bundesliga is placed third in UEFA rankings, which are based on the performance of clubs in the UEFA Champions League and the UEFA Europa League.

Football in Germany is (like in most European countries) the number one attended and practiced sport. Besides the national league, the FIFA World Cup and UEFA European Championship have much attention among its population.

Bayern Munich (German: Bayern München) is the most successful German football club, with 30 national championships, 20 National Cups and 6 European Champions titles (three European Cups and three Champions Leagues) to its credit, as well as several other international titles. Like many other German football clubs, Bayern Munich is a multi-sport club.

The Germany national football team is one of the traditional powers of international football. It won the FIFA World Cup in 1954, 1974, 1990 and 2014 and the UEFA European Championship in 1972 and 1980 as West Germany hosted the UEFA Euro 1988 and in 1996 as Germany. The country will also host the upcoming UEFA Euro 2024. They also won the FIFA Confederations Cup in 2017. Miroslav Klose is the leading goal scorer for the national team with 71 goals, but his fame is perhaps eclipsed by that of Franz Beckenbauer who is one of the few men in the world who have won the World Cup both as a coach and a player. Germany also hosted the World Cup in 1974 and 2006, finishing third in 2006 after losing a close semi-final contest to eventual cup winners Italy.

The women's national team is also a world power, with its wins of the FIFA Women's World Cup in 2003 and 2007, making Germany the only nation to win both the men's and women's World Cup and European titles.

Handball

Germany together with Denmark is regarded as the birthplace of handball. The first match of the modern era was officially recorded on 29 October 1917 in Berlin, Germany. Carl Schelenz is credited developing most rules of modern handball. Outdoor Handball had its only Olympic Games appearance in the 1936 Berlin Olympics. The first international match recorded was played on 3 September 1925 between Germany and Austria. 

Handball is widely regarded to be the second most popular team sport in Germany and when a study conducted by Repucom asked people which sport besides football they preferred a total of 33% voted handball, while basketball came in second with 25% of the votes, ice hockey got 24%, and volleyball got 11%. It is also the second-most played team sport in Germany with approximately 750,000 active registered players around the country as of 2016.

The German men's national team have won the IHF World Men's Handball Championship three times, the very first world cup in 1938, the West Germany team won it in 1978 and the united German team won it at home in 2007. They also have been crowned European champions twice first in 2004 and then in the 2016 rendition of the tournament. In the Olympic Games their efforts have resulted in one gold medal (1936), two silver medals (1984 and 2004) and one Bronze medal (2016). 

The German Handball Bundesliga is considered to be the most competitive professional league in the world and several teams have won the EHF Champions League. A total of 19 times have a team from Germany won the Champions League as of 2017 which is the most out of any nation. The most successful team in Germany is by far THW Kiel which have won 20 German titles as well as 3 Champions League titles. They are the only team in German sport history to have managed to go a whole season without losing any points, this feat was achieved during the 2011–2012 season. Traditionally the teams in the league have been situated in smaller cities where the competition from football have not been so tough (Kiel and Flensburg for example), but during the 21st century more teams from larger cities have emerged such as HSV Hamburg, TSV Hannofer-Burgdorf, TVB Stuttgart, SC DHfK Leipzig and Füchse Berlin. Uwe Gensheimer is a popular German handball player.

The sport attracts large television viewership; around 16 million TV viewers watched as Germany beat Poland in the 2007 World Cup as well as 13 million during the 2016 European Cup final. During the 2014–15 HBL season the game between the Rhein-Neckar Löwen and HSV Hamburg broke the world record for most spectators in a handball game with 44,189 spectators in the Commerzbank-Arena in Frankfurt beating the previous record of 36,651 spectators during the 2011 Danish league final between AG København and Bjerringbro-Silkeborg.

Ice hockey

Ice hockey is one of Germany's most popular sports, although considering its importance and spectator popularity in the nation it is ranked far behind football. There are many leagues but the top one is the 14 team Deutsche Eishockey Liga. The Germany men's national ice hockey team has featured several prominent current and former NHL players, including Hart Trophy winner Leon Draisaitl, Philipp Grubauer, Tim Stützle, Dominik Kahun, Christian Ehrhoff, Jochen Hecht, Dennis Seidenberg, Thomas Greiss, Marcel Goc and Marco Sturm and NHL prospects like Alexander Sulzer, Philip Gogulla, Korbinian Holzer and Marcel Müller. The men's national team is currently ranked 8th in the world.

In 2010, Mannheim  and Cologne co-hosted the Ice Hockey World Championships. Germany defeated the US in the opening game in front of a record breaking crowd of 77,803 in Gelsenkirchen's Veltins-Arena. Germany finished the tournament in fourth place, the nation's best finish since 1953. German goaltender Dennis Endras was named the tournament's top goaltender by the IIHF directors and the top goaltender and most valuable player by the media.

Basketball

Together with football, ice hockey and handball, basketball in Germany is among the most popular spectator sports.. The Basketball Bundesliga is the highest level league of professional club basketball in Germany.
 
One of the most popular non-football athletes to come out of Germany is Dirk Nowitzki, who played as power forward for the Dallas Mavericks in his 21-year career in the NBA. He was a 14-time NBA All-star and was a part of 12 All-NBA teams. In , he became the first player trained totally outside the U.S. to be named league MVP, and in 2011 led the Mavericks to their first NBA title and earned a Finals MVP doing so.

The Germany national basketball team's biggest successes are the victory in the European Championship of 1993 at home in Germany, the silver medal in the 2005 European Championships and the bronze medal in the 2002 FIBA World Championship.

Motorsport

Germany is one of the leading motorsports countries in the world. While countless race winning cars have come from Germany, only Michael Schumacher, Sebastian Vettel and Nico Rosberg have been Formula One world champions (they have won 12 titles combined) and Walter Röhrl being the sole World Rally Champion from Germany (he won two titles). Jochen Rindt, who was F1 world champion in 1970, was born in Germany but raced with an Austrian licence for his whole career. One other German driver came close to winning the title: Wolfgang von Trips. Unfortunately, he died in a crash in the last race of the season at Monza in 1961, giving the championship to his Ferrari teammate Phil Hill.

Schumacher is tied with Lewis Hamilton for the most Formula One Drivers championships with 7. In 2003, Schumacher set a new record for driver's championships when he surpassed Juan Manuel Fangio's total of 5 championships, a record that had stood for 46 years since 1957. He was also the highest paid athlete in sports history, with an annual salary of some U.S. $70 million from the Ferrari team, and an estimated $25–30 million more coming from endorsements. In 2005, he became the world's first billionaire athlete, according to Eurobusiness magazine. He is regarded as one of the greatest drivers of all time; when he first retired at the end of the 2006 season, he held 7 championships and every significant F1 record. He returned to F1 in 2010, celebrated his completion of 20 years in F1 in August 2011, and retired for a second time at the end of the 2012 season.

In 2010, Vettel became the youngest driver ever to win the world championship, he also successfully defended the title in 2011, 2012 and 2013. Before winning his first F1 drivers' championship, Vettel had already been the youngest ever to drive at a Grand Prix meeting, earn F1 world championship points, start from pole position in an F1 race, and finish as runner-up for the drivers' championship.

In 2016, Nico Rosberg became the third German driver to win the Formula One World Championship.

The DTM (Deutsche Tourenwagen Masters) is the national touring car series. It is considered one of the best touring car series in the world. Many Formula 1 drivers have made the switch to the series, including, Mika Häkkinen, Jean Alesi and others. From 1995, only German marques of cars are allowed to compete in the series. Currently only Audi, BMW and Mercedes-Benz compete, but Opel and Alfa Romeo have a history in the sport. The races are held mainly in Germany, but some races occur elsewhere in Europe. The races draw monster crowds and television ratings and many celebrities have attended race days.

Situated in Germany is the Nürburgring with its historical Nordschleife course. Since 1970 it is host to the annual 24 Hours Nürburgring endurance race, one of the biggest motorsports events in the world with over 200 participating teams and over 800 drivers, many of them touring car legends and veterans, among hundreds of thousands of live spectators camping along the race track.

In sports car racing, Stefan Bellof and Hans-Joachim Stuck won the World Sportscar Championship in 1984 and 1985, whilst more recently André Lotterer, Timo Bernhard and Marc Lieb won the World Endurance Championship in 2012, 2015 and 2016  respectively.

The 24 Hours of Le Mans is a prestigious annual race held in France. Porsche has won the race 16 times, far more than any other constructor. Second on the list is Audi, who have dominated the race in recent years, scoring 11 wins since their first in the year 2000. Audi driver Frank Biela was one of the most successful drivers in touring and sports cars in the 1990s and 2000s, winning the FIA World Touring Car Cup in 1995 and the Guia Race in 1996, as well as the German, French and British Touring Car titles, before winning the Le Mans 24 Hours five times and the 12 Hours of Sebring four times.

Winter sports

Germany is one of the most successful winter sport nations. Its dominance in sledding disciplines can be attributed to it being the only country in the world to have four bobsleigh, luge, and skeleton tracks. These tracks are located in Altenberg, Königssee, Oberhof, and Winterberg.

Germany has long been dominant in the sport of Bobsledding having won more medals in the Winter Olympics than any other nation except Switzerland. However, if medal wins by East Germany and West Germany from 1949 through 1990 are combined, Germany's medal count is nearly double that of Switzerland. At the 2006 Winter Olympics in Turin, André Lange piloted both the two-man and four-man sleds to gold, sweeping the men's bobsledding events.

In luge, Germany is dominant like no other nation, stretching from luge's foundation in the early 20th century with dominance in the European championships to the Winter Olympics. Noted lugers include Georg Hackl, Klaus Bonsack, Margit Schumann, David Möller, Felix Loch, Silke Kraushaar-Pielach, Sylke Otto, Tatjana Hüfner and Natalie Geisenberger. Since the 1964 Olympic Games Germany has won 87 of 153 medals. German athletes even won 38 of 51 Olympic gold medals (75%).

In skeleton, Germany has been dominant with the likes of Kerstin Jürgens and Anja Huber.

Biathlon has become one of the most popular winter sports in Germany in recent years, and enjoys some of the highest TV ratings in Germany for any sport aside from association football. Germany has won 59 Olympic medals in biathlon, more than any other nation, and is the joint most successful nation in terms of Olympic golds won, with Germany and Russia having won 20 golds each. Some of Germany's most successful biathletes include Frank-Peter Roetsch, Michael Greis, Sven Fischer, Ricco Groß and Frank Luck among the men and Uschi Disl, Andrea Henkel, Kati Wilhelm, Magdalena Neuner and Laura Dahlmeier among the women.

Tobias Angerer has enjoyed success in cross-country skiing, winning consecutive overall FIS Cross-Country World Cups in 2005/06 and 2006/07. Other notable cross-country skiers include Peter Schlickenrieder, Axel Teichmann and Jens Filbrich.

Along with biathlon, ski jumping is the most popular winter sport in Germany, with TV broadcasts regularly attracting five million viewers, and the country has produced a number of top jumpers. Jens Weißflog is Germany's most successful ski jumper and was one of the top competitors in the world from the mid-1980s to the mid-1990s. Other notable athletes include Hans-Georg Aschenbach, Sven Hannawald, Martin Schmitt and Severin Freund. Two of the four rounds of the prestigious Four Hills Tournament are held on German hills, at Oberstdorf and Garmisch-Partenkirchen.

German athletes have been competitive in Nordic combined. Title-winning competitors include Georg Thoma, Ulrich Wehling, Hermann Weinbuch, Ronny Ackermann and Eric Frenzel.

Germany has enjoyed great success in alpine skiing, although the most successful German alpine skiers have tended to be female. One notable male alpine skier was Markus Wasmeier. Felix Neureuther is Germany's most successful male skier in terms of World Cup race wins with 13. Rosi Mittermaier, Katja Seizinger and Maria Höfl-Riesch have won multiple world-level titles on the women's circuit.

In speed skating Germany has been a major power, particularly in women's competition. Four of the five most prolific winners in the women's ISU Speed Skating World Cup are German – Gunda Niemann-Stirnemann, Jenny Wolf, Anni Friesinger-Postma and Monique Garbrecht-Enfeldt. Claudia Pechstein won nine Olympic medals in long track speed skating, more than any other skater, male or female. Successful male German speed skaters have included Erhard Keller and Uwe-Jens Mey. Success in short track speed skating has been harder to come by, however Tyson Heung did win the overall ISU Short Track Speed Skating World Cup in 2006/07.

Germany has a heritage in figure skating extending to the early days of international competition – Oskar Uhlig won the inaugural European Figure Skating Championships in 1891, while the first male and pairs World Champions were Gilbert Fuchs in 1896 and the pairing of Anna Hübler and Heinrich Burger in 1908 (Hübler and Burger were also the first Olympic gold medalists in pairs competition at the 1908 Games). Germany's best-known figure skater is Katarina Witt, a double Olympic gold medalist in the 1980s. Other notable German competitors include Manfred Schnelldorfer, Jan Hoffmann, Gabriele Seyfert, Anett Pötzsch and the pairings of Ria Baran and Paul Falk, Marika Kilius and Hans-Jürgen Bäumler, and Aliona Savchenko and Robin Szolkowy.

Germany has been a regular competitor in Olympic Curling since the sport was reintroduced at the 1998 Winter Olympics. The German men's and women's teams both won World Curling Championships in 1992 and 1994. A related sport, known as Eisstockschiessen or ice stock sport, is played in southern Germany.

While a minor sport in the country, Germany national bandy team has qualified for Division A of the 2017 Bandy World Championship. In terms of licensed athletes, bandy is the second biggest winter sport in the world.

Tennis

The two most successful German tennis players of all time are Steffi Graf and Boris Becker.

Becker became the youngest champion in the history of the men's singles at Wimbledon, won six-time Grand Slam singles titles and an Olympic gold medal together with Michael Stich.

Graf won 22 Grand Slam singles titles, second among male and female players. In 1988, she became the first and only tennis player (male or female) to achieve the Calendar Year Golden Slam by winning all four Grand Slam singles titles and the Olympic gold medal in the same calendar year.

The German Open Hamburg was part of the Grand Prix Super Series from 1978 to 1989, and the ATP Masters Series from 1990 to 2008, whereas the Eurocard Open was part of the ATP Masters Series from 1995 to 2001. The German Open Hamburg is an ATP World Tour 500 since 2009, and the Halle Open was upgraded to that category in 2015. Also, the ATP Tour World Championships and Grand Slam Cup were played in Germany from 1990 to 1999. Meanwhile, the Women's German Open was a Tier I tournament from 1988 to 2008, and the Women's Stuttgart Open is a WTA Tier II / Premier tournament since 1990.

Cycling
Cycling is a popular sport in Germany and one of the greatest riders of recent times Jan Ullrich dominated the Tour de France in 1997. He finished a full 9 minutes in front of second place rider Richard Virenque. Jan was regarded as Lance Armstrong's only consistent rival, finishing second to him several times in the Tour de France. Recently Tony Martin has emerged as one of the top Individual time trial specialists in the world, winning the time trial at the UCI Road World Championships in 2011, 2012, 2013 and 2016. André Greipel has been one of the most prolific winners among road sprinters since his breakthrough in the late 2000s, while fellow sprinters Marcel Kittel and John Degenkolb have also enjoyed major success from the early 2010s. In the three-year period from 2014 to 2016, Germany took more stage wins than any other nation in the Tour de France. Germany also topped the medal table at the 2016 UCI Road World Championships. In 2017 Germany hosted the start of the Tour de France for the fourth time, and for the first time since the race started in West Berlin in 1987, with the first two stages starting in Düsseldorf.

Chess
Chess is a popular sport in Germany. There are about 84 Grandmasters and 242 International Masters in Germany. Emanuel Lasker was a famous German chess player who was World Chess Champion for 27 years.

Golf

As recently as 2007, Germany hosted three events on golf's European Tour—the Deutsche Bank Players Championship of Europe, the Mercedes-Benz Championship and the BMW International Open. However, since 2010, the only European Tour event in Germany has been the BMW International Open. The Players Championship was scrapped after 2007; the Mercedes-Benz Championship was not held in 2008, resumed in 2009, and dropped again in 2010. In 2015, the European Open was revived as a German tournament.

The Solheim Cup, the women's counterpart to the Ryder Cup, was hosted by Germany in 2015.

Two-time Masters champion Bernhard Langer is the first German to have won a major championship and is a former World No. 1. Since turning 50 in 2007, he has played mainly on the U.S. senior circuit, PGA Tour Champions; he has led that tour in prize money in 10 of his 11 full seasons, and has won a record 10 senior majors in his career (The Tradition in 2016 and 2017; the Senior PGA Championship in 2017; the U.S. Senior Open in 2010; the Senior Players Championship in 2014, 2015, and 2016; and The Senior Open Championship in 2010, 2014, and 2017). Langer is also the only golfer to have won all five of the current senior majors. Martin Kaymer became the second German to win a major championship by winning the 2010 PGA Championship in Wisconsin, and in 2011 rose to World No. 1. In 2014 he also won the U.S. Open Championship at Pinehurst No. 2, North Carolina.

Boxing

Boxing is among the most watched TV sports in Germany with both male and female fights enjoying regular spots on national television. Wladimir and Vitali Klitschko are among the two most popular boxers in Germany. German television network RTL has listed the Klitschko brothers as their most important asset next to football. In recent years Germany has become a hub for boxing, the Vegas of Europe, and many international fighters travel to fight out of the country. Henry Maske is a successful recent German box champion.

Max Schmeling was heavyweight champion of the world between 1930 and 1932. His two fights with Joe Louis in the late 1930s transcended boxing, and became worldwide social events because of their national associations. He was ranked 55 on Ring Magazine's list of 100 greatest punchers of all time.

Rugby union

The first German rugby team was formed at Neuenheim College around 1850. Heidelberger Ruderklub von 1872 founded in 1872 is the oldest German rugby club. The German Rugby Federation was set up in 1900. Germany was Olympic silver medallist in rugby union in 1900. Today the Germany national rugby union team competes in the top division of the European Nations Cup.

Rugby league

Rugby league is a minor sport in Germany, having been introduced in August 2004 by Simon Cooper who was born in Halifax, England and whose father is German. Prior to that it had been played informally by expat players associations such as British servicemen and students.  The national governing body for the sport, Rugby League Deutschland, is an associate member of the Rugby League European Federation.  The country's national team are regular competitors in the European Shield, winning the competition in 2006 and 2011.

Water sports
Water sports like sailing, rowing, swimming, wind- and kitesurfing, wakeboarding, underwater diving, fishing, powerboating water aerobics and yachting are popular in Germany, especially with large annual events such as Kiel Week or Hanse Sail in Rostock.

American football

The history of American football in Germany began in 1977, when the Frankfurter Löwen were formed as the first club to play the game in Germany. The German Football League (GFL) is the elite league for American football in Germany and was formed in 1979 and is among the best leagues in Europe. Playing rules are based on those of the American NCAA. In 1999, the league switched its name from American-Football-Bundesliga to German Football League.
 European league of football was officially created in November 2020, and  kicked off its inaugural season in June 2021. The majority of teams in this league are based in Germany.

Lacrosse 
Lacrosse has been played in Germany since 1992, with roughly 5,000 players registered in the German Lacrosse Association (DLAXV - Deutscher Lacrosse-Verband e.V.). It is growing fast, with youth hotbeds being at the SC 1880 Frankfurt and the Berliner Hockey Club.

Germany has sent national teams to the Under-19 World Lacrosse Championships.

Bandy
Bandy was played in Germany in the early 20th century, but the players and audience then turned to football and ice hockey instead. The sport was reintroduced in the 21st century, with the German Bandy Federation being founded in 2013. A national championship has been played every winter since 2014/15.

Beach volleyball 
Germany featured a men's national team in beach volleyball that competed at the 2018–2020 CEV Beach Volleyball Continental Cup.

See also

 Baseball in Germany
 Bundesjugendspiele

References

Further reading
 Carr, Gerald A. "The involvement of politics in the sporting relationships of East and West Germany, 1945-1972." Journal of Sport History 7.1 (1980): 40-51. online
 Ebert, Anne‐Katrin. "Cycling towards the nation: the use of the bicycle in Germany and the Netherlands, 1880–1940." European Review of History: Revue européenne d'histoire 11.3 (2004): 347-364.
 Frick, Bernd, and Joachim Prinz. "Crisis? What crisis? football in Germany." Journal of Sports Economics 7.1 (2006): 60-75.
 Hanssen-Doose, Anke, et al. "Population-based trends in physical fitness of children and adolescents in Germany, 2003–2017." European Journal of Sport Science (2020): 1-11.
 Koebel, Michel. "The organisation of sport and sports policies in Germany." in Sport, Welfare and Social Policy in the European Union (Routledge, 2020) pp. 75-85.

 Krüger, Michael. "Historiography, Cultures of Remembrance and Tradition in German Sport." International Journal of the History of Sport (2014) 31#12 pp 1425-1443.

 Large, David Clay. Nazi games: the Olympics of 1936 (WW Norton & Company, 2007).

 McDougall, Alan. "Whose Game Is It Anyway?" Radical History Review (May 2016), Issue 125, p35-54; the history of East German football after 1950.
 McDougall, Alan. The People's Game: Football, State and Society in East Germany (Cambridge University Press, 2014).
 Meier, Henk Erik, and Cosima von Uechtriz. "The Key Role of Sport Policies for the Popularity of Women’s Sports: A Case Study on Women’s Soccer in Germany." Sociology of Sport Journal 37.4 (2020): 328-345.
 Meier, Henk Erik, Borja García, and Mara Konjer. "Resisting the pressures of globalisation: the repeated failure of elite sport reforms in re-united Germany." German Politics (2020): 1-21.
 Merkel, Udo. "Football fans and clubs in Germany: conflicts, crises and compromises." Soccer & Society 13.3 (2012): 359-376. online
 Schiller, Kay, and Chris Young. The 1972 Munich Olympics and the making of modern Germany (Univ of California Press, 2010).
 Schulz, Saskia Sarah, Klaus Lenz, and Karin Büttner-Janz. "Severe back pain in elite athletes: a cross-sectional study on 929 top athletes of Germany." European Spine Journal 25.4 (2016): 1204-1210.
 Suckow, Christina. "Literature review on brand equity in professional team sport: a German perspective on ice hockey." International Journal of sport management and marketing 5.1-2 (2009): 211-225.

External links 
 DOSB site
 German Football Association